Alain Rodet (born 4 June 1944) was a member of the National Assembly of France. He represented Haute-Vienne's 1st constituency,  and was a member of the Socialiste, radical, citoyen et divers gauche. He was Mayor of Limoges from 1990 to 2014.

References

1944 births
Living people
Socialist Party (France) politicians
Deputies of the 12th National Assembly of the French Fifth Republic
Deputies of the 13th National Assembly of the French Fifth Republic
Deputies of the 14th National Assembly of the French Fifth Republic
Sciences Po alumni
Mayors of places in Nouvelle-Aquitaine
People from Limoges
People from Drôme

Members of Parliament for Haute-Vienne